Flamur is an Albanian masculine given name, taken from the Albanian word flamur, meaning "flag". Notable people bearing the name Flamur include:

Flamur Bajrami (born 1997), Kosovar footballer 
Flamur Kastrati (born 1991), Kosovar footballer 
Flamur Noka (born 1971), Albanian politician, former Minister of the Interior
Flamur Ruçi (born 2002), Albanian footballer
Flamur Tairi (born 1990), Macedonian-Albanian footballer

References

Masculine given names
Albanian masculine given names